Kelly MacLaury Pajala (born December 15, 1978) is an American politician who serves as a member of the Vermont House of Representatives from the Windham-Bennington-Windsor district as an independent.

Early life and education

Kelly MacLaury Pajala was born in Pennington, New Jersey, on December 15, 1978, and her family moved to Vermont when she was eleven. She graduated from the Burr and Burton Academy and Skidmore College with a Bachelor of Arts in women's studies. Pajala served as the assistant town clerk in Weston and town clerk in Londonderry, Vermont.

Vermont House of Representatives

In 2017, Oliver Olsen, an independent member of the Vermont House of Representatives, resigned to focus on his business career. Governor Phil Scott appointed Pajala as she was also an independent. She won in the 2018 and 2020 elections without opposition. She serves on the Human Services committee.

Electoral history

References

21st-century American politicians
21st-century American women politicians
1978 births
Living people
Members of the Vermont House of Representatives
Skidmore College alumni
Vermont Independents
Women state legislators in Vermont